Andrea Cornaro may refer to:

 Andrea Cornaro, Marquess of Bodonitsa (died 1323), Venetian nobleman
 Andrea Cornaro (historian) (1547–1616), a Venetian poet and historian
 Andrea Cornaro (cardinal) (1511–1551), Italian Roman Catholic bishop and cardinal
 Andrea Cornaro (architect), 17th-century Venetian architect; see Gates of Belgrade